Xieji ( unless otherwise noted) may refer to the following locations in China:

 Xieji, Guangdong, in Gaozhou
 Xieji, Henan, in Liangyuan District, Shangqiu
 Xieji, Shandong, in Shan County
 Xieji Township, Linquan County, Anhui